Min Hyo-rin (born Jung Eun-ran on 5 February 1986) is a South Korean actress, model and singer. She made her breakthrough with her role in the South Korean film Sunny (2011), followed by The Grand Heist (2012) – both cited as one of South Korea's highest-grossing box office hits.

Career
Born in Daegu as Jung Eun-ran, she adopted the stage name Min Hyo-rin when she began modeling for the clothing brand Flapper in 2006. She then appeared in several music videos for Park Ki-young and F.T. Island. Before her singing debut, large teaser posters of her were displayed around the hot spots of Seoul as a promotional stunt. She released the album RinZ in 2007, and the single Touch Me in 2008.

In 2009 Min made her acting debut in the television series Triple opposite Lee Jung-jae and Song Joong-ki. She was the lead actress in a 2010 web series adapted from Alain de Botton's novel Romantic Movement, with four different directors each shooting short films in various locations around Seoul.

Min was paired with singer Seven in the reality show Fox's Butler, and hosted the sixth season of cable channel Mnet's Trend Report Feel from 2010 to 2011.

In 2011, she and Choi Daniel starred in Age of Milk, a short film that was shot using a Samsung Galaxy S smartphone and aired on cable channel OCN. Later that year, she was cast in the TV series Romance Town with Sung Yu-ri and Kim Min-jun, and appeared in Song Jieun's music video "Going Crazy."

After being part of the ensemble cast of 2011 retro drama Sunny along with Shim Eun-kyung and Kang So-ra, Min played Cha Tae-hyun's love interest in the 2012 period comedy The Grand Heist. Both were huge box office hits. In 2012, Min co-starred with Jo Sung-ha and Park Jin-young in A Millionaire on the Run (also known as Five Million Dollar Man). She next starred in Twenty, a film that depicts the lives and loves of three male friends in their twenties.

In 2015, Min headlined the music drama Persevere Goo Hae Ra, produced by Mnet.

In 2016, Min became a regular cast member in the KBS reality television show Sister's Slam Dunk.

In March 2017, Min signed with Plum Entertainment after her contract with JYP Entertainment ended. The same year, she starred in the two-episode drama The Happy Loner and the cycling film Uhm Bok-dong.

Personal life
Min began a relationship with singer Taeyang, member of the South Korean boy band Big Bang in 2013. In December 2017, it was confirmed by their respective agencies that they were engaged. They married on 3 February 2018 in a private church ceremony.

On 27 September 2021, Min's agency announced that Min was pregnant and awaiting childbirth. In November 2021, Min gave birth to a healthy son.

Filmography

Film

Television series

Web series

Variety show

Music videos

Discography

Awards and nominations

References

External links

1986 births
Living people
JYP Entertainment artists
People from Daegu
South Korean film actresses
South Korean female idols
South Korean television actresses
21st-century South Korean singers
21st-century South Korean women singers